Honeymoon Trip (French: Voyage de noces) is a 1933 Austrian-French comedy film directed by Germain Fried, Joe May  and Erich Schmidt. It stars Brigitte Helm, Albert Préjean and Jacqueline Made. A separate German-language film Three on a Honeymoon was also made.

The film's sets were designed by Artur Berger.

Cast
 Brigitte Helm  as Anita Paglione  
 Albert Préjean as Henri Keller  
 Jacqueline Made  as Jacqueline Lenner  
 Pierre Brasseur  as Rudi 
 Danielle Darrieux  
 Jim Gérald  
 Henri Kerny  
 Charles Lamy  
 Georges Saillard

References

Bibliography 
 Bock, Hans-Michael & Bergfelder, Tim. The Concise Cinegraph: Encyclopaedia of German Cinema. Berghahn Books, 2009.

External links 
 
 Voyage de noces at filmportal.de (English)

1933 films
French comedy films
Austrian comedy films
1933 comedy films
1930s French-language films
Films directed by Joe May
French multilingual films
Films scored by Bronisław Kaper
French black-and-white films
Austrian black-and-white films
Austrian multilingual films
1933 multilingual films
1930s French films